Ed Alexiuk (born 17 May 1952) is a Canadian volleyball player. He competed in the men's tournament at the 1976 Summer Olympics.

References

1952 births
Living people
Canadian men's volleyball players
Olympic volleyball players of Canada
Volleyball players at the 1976 Summer Olympics
Volleyball players from Winnipeg